The 2008 Assen Superbike World Championship round was the 4th round of the 2008 Superbike World Championship. It took place on the weekend of April 25–27, 2008, at the TT Circuit Assen located in Assen, Netherlands.

Superbike race 1 classification

Superbike race 2 classification

Supersport race classification

External links
 Superbike Race 1 results
 Superbike Race 2 results
 Supersport Race results

Assen Round
Assen Superbike World Championship round